S Canis Minoris is a variable star in the equatorial constellation Canis Minor. The star is located at a distance of approximately 1,600 light-years from the Sun based on stellar parallax, and is drifting further away with a radial velocity of about +68 km/s.

This is an aging red giant star with a stellar classification of M7-8e, where the 'e' suffix indicates emission lines in the spectrum. Evidence has been found of asymmetry in this star, suggesting a non-spherical shape. Abundance-wise, it is an oxygen-rich giant and the emission feature is of the oxygen-rich silicate class as it sheds silicate dust from its atmosphere. The star is shedding mass at the rate of ·yr−1.

References

M-type giants
Mira variables
Canis Minor
Durchmusterung objects
059950
036675
Canis Minoris, S
Emission-line stars